Tsao Chang (Chinese: 张操 born 1942 in Shanghai, China) is a Chinese-American physicist.

Chang has taught physics and conducted research on the theory of space and time more than 50 years in China and the United States.

Personal life 
Tsao Chang was born in Shanghai China on April 22, 1942.  He met his wife Bei Lei Dong while attending Fudan university.  They were wed in September 1967.  They had 2 boys.  Their eldest son, John Zhang was a successful business man and on the board for several public companies.  Chang’s younger son, James Zhang is founder and CEO of Concept Art House, a video game developer.

Physics career 
In 1965 Chang graduated from Fudan University, China with a degree in Nuclear physics. Chinadaily's interview

Tsao Chang has taught electrodynamics and modern physics in China and the United States.

From 1980—1982, he was a visiting scholar in the Physics department at the University of Massachusetts Amherst.

He taught in the Department of Physics, Shanghai University of Science and Technology from 1982—1985.

In 1985—1989, Chang was a visiting professor in Utah State University and the University of Alabama in the United States.

His research areas cover superluminal neutrinos and the theory of relativity.http://en.scientificcommons.org/tsao_chang

He has produced more than 30 research papers and two books.

From 1989—2002 he conducted research on space physics in the University of Alabama.

In an international conference "in early 1985, T. Chang predicted neutrinos may be Superluminal particles".

Since 2002, his research has centered on the theory of space and time. He has published six research papers and two books.

References

Fudan University alumni
21st-century American physicists
1942 births
Living people